Luciana Mendoza (born 14 March 1990) is an Argentine handball player for Achenheim Truchtersheim Handball and the Argentina women's national handball team.

She defended Argentina at the 2011 World Women's Handball Championship in Brazil.

References

External links

1990 births
Living people
Argentine female handball players
Handball players at the 2016 Summer Olympics
Olympic handball players of Argentina
Pan American Games medalists in handball
Pan American Games silver medalists for Argentina
Handball players at the 2011 Pan American Games
Handball players at the 2015 Pan American Games
Handball players at the 2019 Pan American Games
Sportspeople from Lanús
Expatriate handball players
Argentine expatriate sportspeople in Spain
Argentine expatriate sportspeople in France
South American Games silver medalists for Argentina
South American Games medalists in handball
Competitors at the 2018 South American Games
Medalists at the 2015 Pan American Games
Medalists at the 2019 Pan American Games
Medalists at the 2011 Pan American Games
20th-century Argentine women
21st-century Argentine women